María Laura Stratta (born 22 February 1976) is an Argentine politician, currently serving as Vice Governor of Entre Ríos Province, deputising for Governor Gustavo Bordet, since 10 December 2019. From 2015 to 2019, Stratta served as Minister of Social Development of her province, having previously served as a member of the provincial Chamber of Deputies.

She is a member of the Justicialist Party.

Early life and education
María Laura Stratta was born on 22 February 1976 in Victoria, Entre Ríos Province. Her mother was a high school teacher, while her father, Juan Carlos Stratta, was active in provincial politics: he was intendente (mayor) of Victoria from 1987 to 1991, and served in both houses of the provincial Legislature.

Stratta counts with a degree on communication studies from the National University of Entre Ríos, in Concepción del Uruguay.

Political career
Stratta's political activism began in the Justicialist Party. She was the provincial representative of the Social Development Ministry's Banco Popular de la Buena Fe programme.

In the 2011 provincial elections, she was elected to the Chamber of Deputies of Entre Ríos as part of the Justicialist Party list in Victoria Department. During her four-year term, she presided the parliamentary commission on General Legislation and served as president of the province's Scholarships Institute. She also authroed Law 10.151, which sought to boost the provincial state's welfare investment.

Upon the end of her term as legislator, in December 2015, she was appointed by newly elected governor Gustavo Bordet as Minister of Social Development of Entre Ríos. She additionally served as a legislative aide to a number of national congresspeople and in the 2008 Constitutional Convention of Entre Ríos.

Vice Governor
Ahead of the 2019 general election, Governor Gustavo Bordet announced Stratta would be his running mate in his re-election bid as part of the Frente Justicialista CREER The ticket won with over 57% of the vote, and the two were elected. Stratta is the first female vice governor of Entre Ríos.

Personal life
Stratta is married and has two children, Juan and Bruno.

References

External links

1976 births
Living people
21st-century Argentine women politicians
People from Entre Ríos Province
Vice Governors of Entre Ríos Province
Justicialist Party politicians
National University of Entre Ríos alumni
21st-century Argentine politicians